Louisa Elizabeth Allen (born 1972) is a New Zealand sex education academic. She is currently a full professor at the University of Auckland.

Academic career

After a 2000 PhD titled Exploring relationships' : a study of young people's (hetero)sexual subjectivities, knowledge and practices.'  at the University of Cambridge, she moved to the University of Auckland, rising to full professor.

Selected works 
 Allen, Louisa. "Girls want sex, boys want love: Resisting dominant discourses of (hetero) sexuality." Sexualities 6, no. 2 (2003): 215–236.
 Allen, Louisa. Sexual subjects: Young people, sexuality and education. Springer, 2005.
 Allen, Louisa. "Beyond the birds and the bees: Constituting a discourse of erotics in sexuality education." Gender and education 16, no. 2 (2004): 151–167.
 Allen, Louisa. "‘Say everything’: Exploring young people's suggestions for improving sexuality education." Sex Education 5, no. 4 (2005): 389-404.
 Allen, Louisa. "Closing sex education's knowledge/practice gap: the reconceptualisation of young people's sexual knowledge." Sex Education: Sexuality, Society and Learning 1, no. 2 (2001): 109–122.
 Allen, Louisa. "Managing masculinity: Young men's identity work in focus groups." Qualitative Research 5, no. 1 (2005): 35–57.

References

External links
  

Living people
1972 births
Academic staff of the University of Auckland
New Zealand women academics
Alumni of the University of Cambridge
Sex educators
New Zealand educational theorists
21st-century New Zealand women writers